Robert James Percival Frampton (January 20, 1929 – September 8, 2001) was a Canadian professional ice hockey forward who played 2 regular-season games and 3 Stanley Cup playoff games in the National Hockey League for the Montreal Canadiens.

In his last year of junior ice hockey, Frampton won the 1949 Memorial Cup as a member of the Montreal Royals; this was the first ever Memorial Cup win by a team from Quebec.

External links
 

1929 births
2001 deaths
Canadian expatriate ice hockey players in the United States
Canadian ice hockey forwards
Canadian people of English descent
Cincinnati Mohawks (AHL) players
Montreal Canadiens players
Montreal Royals (QSHL) players
Ice hockey people from Toronto